Victor Arbekov (8 March 1942 – 18 February 2017) was a Russian Grand Prix motocross racer. He competed in the Motocross World Championships from 1963 to 1969. Arbekov is notable for being the first Russian competitor to win an FIM motocross world championship.

Biography 
Arbekov was born in Podolsk, a city in Moscow Oblast. Arbekov started racing during 1959 in the 125 cc class on a home-built machine. He worked as a mechanic and his first top category race was in the 1963 Russian 250 cc Grand Prix.

In 1964, Arbekov finished the 250cc motocross world championship in third place behind Joël Robert and Torsten Hallman. The following year, he defeated Robert to win the 1965 FIM Motocross World Championship, on a CZ motorcycle.

Arbekov died on 18 February 2017 at the age of 74.

References 

1942 births
2017 deaths
People from Podolsk
Russian motocross riders
Soviet motocross riders
Lesgaft National State University of Physical Education, Sport and Health alumni
Sportspeople from Moscow Oblast